The Sukhoi Su-26 is a single-seater aerobatic aircraft from the former Soviet Union, powered by a single radial reciprocating engine. The Su-26 has mid-mounted straight wings and fixed landing gear, the main gear mounted on a solid titanium arc.

The Su-26 made its first flight in June 1984, the original four having a two-bladed propeller. The production switched to the Su-26M, with refined tail surfaces and a German-made MTV-9 3-blade composite propeller. Further refinements were made, and the model won both the men's and women's team prizes at the 1986 World Aerobatics Championships. The modified Su-26M3 with the new M9F  engine dominated the 2003 and 2005 Aerobatic World Championships as well as the 2004 European Championships.

The Su-26 has fully metric instruments, except for the altimeter.

Specifications (Su-26)

In popular culture
IL-2 Sturmovik: Cliffs of Dover is a combat flight simulation video game mainly set in the Battle of Britain in 1940. Nevertheless, when the game was still under development, the Sukhoi Su-26 had been promised as a bonus flyable aircraft for all players, but was not included in the game upon release in March 2011. It was finally included as downloadable content with the adjunction of the Steam patch 1.11.20362 on 19 October 2012.

See also

References

External links

Su-26
1980s Soviet sport aircraft
Aerobatic aircraft
Mid-wing aircraft
Single-engined tractor aircraft
Aircraft first flown in 1984
Conventional landing gear